Costoanachis is a genus of sea snails, marine gastropod mollusks in the family Columbellidae, the dove snails.

Species
Species within the genus Costoanachis include:
 Costoanachis albicostata K. Monsecour & D. Monsecour, 2016
 Costoanachis alcazari Ortea & Espinosa, 2017
 Costoanachis aurea Lussi, 2017
 Costoanachis avara (Say, 1822)
 Costoanachis beckeri (G.B. Sowerby III, 1900)
 Costoanachis calidoscopio Espinosa, Ortea & Diez, 2017
 Costoanachis carmelita Espinosa, Ortea & Fernadez-Garcés, 2007
 Costoanachis cascabulloi Espinosa, Fernandez-Garcès & Ortea, 2004
 Costoanachis castoi Ortea & Espinoza, 2018
 Costoanachis delahozi Ortea & Espinoza, 2018
 Costoanachis floridana (Rehder, 1939)
 Costoanachis geovanysi Espinosa & Ortea, 2014
 † Costoanachis haitensis (G. B. Sowerby I, 1850) 
 Costoanachis hotessieriana (d’Orbigny, 1842)
 Costoanachis indistincta (Thiele, 1925)
 Costoanachis jeffreysbayensis Lussi, 2017
 † Costoanachis peyrehoradensis Lozouet, 2015 
 † Costoanachis praeterebralis Lozouet, 2015 
 † Costoanachis problematica (Laws, 1944) 
 Costoanachis rudyi Espinosa & Ortea, 2006
 † Costoanachis saccostata Radwin, 1968 
 Costoanachis scutulata (Reeve, 1859)
 Costoanachis semiplicata (Stearns, 1873)
 Costoanachis sertulariarum (d'Orbigny, 1839)
 Costoanachis similis (Ravenel, 1861)
 Costoanachis sparsa (Reeve, 1859)
 Costoanachis stimpsoni (Bartsch, 1915)
 † Costoanachis terebralis (Grateloup, 1834) 
 Costoanachis translirata (Ravenel, 1861)

Species brought into synonymy
 Costoanachis bacalladoi Espinosa, Ortea & Moro, 2008: synonym of Anachis bacalladoi Espinosa, Ortea & Moro, 2008
 Costoanachis dentilabia Lussi, 2009: synonym of Retizafra dentilabia (Lussi, 2009)
 Costoanachis fenneli Radwin, 1968: synonym of Anachis fenneli Radwin, 1968
 Costoanachis fluctuata (G. B. Sowerby I, 1832): synonym of Anachis fluctuata (G. B. Sowerby I, 1832)
 Costoanachis lafresnayi (P. Fischer & Bernardi, 1857): synonym of Cotonopsis lafresnayi (P. Fischer & Bernardi, 1857)
 Costoanachis rassierensis Smythe, 1985: synonym of Anachis rassierensis Smythe, 1985
 Costoanachis rugosa (G. B. Sowerby I, 1832): synonym of Anachis rugosa (G. B. Sowerby I, 1832)
 Costoanachis valae Lussi, 2009: synonym of Retizafra valae (Lussi, 2009)
 Costoanachis varia (G. B. Sowerby I, 1832: synonym of Anachis varia (G. B. Sowerby I, 1832)

References
Notes

Bibliography
 Pelorce J. (2017). Les Columbellidae (Gastropoda: Neogastropoda) de la Guyane française. Xenophora Taxonomy. 14: 4-21.
Deep-water Columbellidae (Mollusca: Gastropoda) from New Caledonia, in HEROS V., STRONG E. & BOUCHET P. (eds), Tropical Deep-Sea Benthos 29. Mémoires du Muséum national d'Histoire naturelle 208: 291-362

External links
 Sacco, F. (1890). I molluschi dei terreni terziarii del Piemonte e della Liguria. Parte VI. (Volutidae, Marginellidae, Columbellidae). Carlo Clausen, Torino, 76 pp., 2 pl

Columbellidae